Saint Mark's English Church is an Anglican church in Florence, Italy.

The church forms part of the chaplaincy of St Mark's Florence with Holy Cross Bologna, in the Diocese in Europe of the Church of England.

The last permanent chaplain at St Mark's was Father William Lister, who retired at the end of 2020. The current chaplain is a locum replacement. Prior to the COVID-19 pandemic in 2020–2021, the average congregation was about 100. The church ministers to the homeless in Florence. It also has vibrant music and cultural programs, with annual resident choirmaster and organ master interns, who provide vocal and instrumental concerts and recitals with visiting musicians, along with sacred and devotional music at Sunday mass and evensong. The St Mark's Cultural Association offers a Book Club and Armchair Drama Club; Florence Writers offers discussions and workshop on writing, literature, and poetry. Opera at St Mark's has been offering opera performances by its resident opera company for more than ten years.

History 
St Mark's was founded by the Reverend Charles Tooth as a centre of worship for Anglo-Catholic members of the Anglican Church in Florence. He started a house church at 1 Via dei Serragli in 1877 to teach Anglo-Catholic principles and celebrate the Holy Eucharist daily during the week. In 1880, Tooth purchased a 15th-century palazzo to meet the new congregation's needs. John Roddam Spencer Stanhope designed and created the wall and ceiling decorations at his own expense. The first Holy Eucharist was celebrated there on 1 May 1881, although chaplain and church were not licensed for service by the bishop until 1884. The premises were extended by the purchase of 16 Via Maggio in 1906.

The church was damaged by the 1966 Flood of the Arno River, resulting in the loss of George Frederick Bodley's 19th-century stencil work on the lower walls, although some survived behind a display cabinet.

St. Mark's was the second Anglican church to be built in Florence. The British community in Florence has a long history and the chaplaincy began in the late 1820s. The first church, Holy Trinity, opened in the 1840s. Rebuilt in the 1890s, Trinity Church on the Via Lamarmara, is today a Waldensian Church.

Architecture

Exterior 
The white marble statue in the niche over the main door is Apotheosis of Saint Mark (2007–8) by Jason Arkles. This is the first work by an American sculptor to have a permanent public location in Florence. It was commissioned by the then priest Fr Lawrence MacLean who worked closely with Arkles on this project. They were able to find and use the same marble that Michelangelo's David had once been carved from.

Interior 
The interior is decorated in the Pre-Raphaelite style and the upper reaches of the church have floral motifs with, as described by art historian Berenice Schreiner, "a wonderful sense of naturalism".

Notes

References 

Citations

External links 

 
 

Marks English Church
Churches completed in 1906
Anglican church buildings in Italy
Pre-Raphaelite artworks
Anglo-Catholic church buildings in Italy
Diocese in Europe
1877 establishments in Italy